Walter Dill Scott (1931–2018) was an American businessman who served as CEO of Investors Diversified Services (now Ameriprise Financial) and the managing director of Grand Metropolitan's U.S. division.

Early life
Scott was born in Chicago and grew up in Evanston, Illinois and Winnetka, Illinois. He was named after his grandfather, who was president of Northwestern University from 1920 to 1939. Scott graduated from Northwestern in 1953 and then spent three years in the United States Navy. After his military service ended, Scott moved to New York City, where he worked for Booz Allen Hamilton and attended Columbia Business School. After graduating in 1958, Scott went to work for Glore, Forgan & Co. In 1961 he married Barbara Stein. They had two sons.

Career
In 1965, Scott was named general partner in charge of the Chicago office of Lehman Brothers. He left the business world in 1973 to become the associate director of the Office of Management and Budget, where he helped assemble the federal budget.

Scott left the OMB in 1975 and joined the Pillsbury Company as senior vice president and chief financial officer. The following year he was added to the company's board of directors and its executive office. He was later given control of Pillsbury's international operations and in 1978 was given the new title of executive vice president for administration and finance. He helped Pillsbury acquire Green Giant, Steak and Ale, and Totino's.

In 1980, Scott left Pillsbury to become the chief executive officer of Investors Diversified Services, then a subsidiary of the Alleghany Corporation. After IDS was acquired by American Express, Scott was removed as CEO in favor of Harvey Golub and reassigned to the position of chairman. He left the company later that year to become the managing director of Grand Metropolitan's U.S. division, which owned Liggett & Myers Tobacco Company and its subsidiary Alpo, Children's World daycare centers, and was a major Pepsi bottler. He left Grand Metropolitan in 1986.

Later life
From 1988 to 2013, Scott was a clinical professor for Northwestern's Kellogg School of Management, teaching courses on corporate strategy and leadership. He also served as chairman of Kellogg's board of advisers. He served on fifteen corporate boards and the boards of 25 nonprofit organizations, including Communities In Schools of Chicago, One Acre Fund, and National Louis University. He was a longtime resident of Northfield, Illinois but moved to Evanston in 2017. Scott died on February 8, 2018, at Evanston Hospital from lymphoma.

References

1931 births
2018 deaths
American chief executives of financial services companies
American chief financial officers
American food industry business executives
Booz Allen Hamilton people
Columbia Business School alumni
Deaths from lymphoma
Lehman Brothers people
Northwestern University alumni
Northwestern University faculty
People from Evanston, Illinois
People from Winnetka, Illinois
United States Office of Management and Budget officials
United States Navy personnel
Ameriprise Financial people